18 (eighteen) is the natural number following 17 and preceding 19.

In mathematics
 Eighteen is a composite number, its divisors being 1, 2, 3, 6 and 9. Three of these divisors (3, 6 and 9) add up to 18, hence 18 is a semiperfect number. Eighteen is the first inverted square-prime of the form p·q2.
 In base ten, it is a Harshad number.
 It is an abundant number, as the sum of its proper divisors is greater than itself (1+2+3+6+9 = 21). It is known to be a solitary number, despite not being coprime to this sum.
 It is the number of one-sided pentominoes.
 It is the only number where the sum of its written digits in base 10 (1+8 = 9) is equal to half of itself (18/2 = 9).
 It is a Fine number.

In science

Chemistry
 Eighteen is the atomic number of argon.
 Group 18 of the periodic table is called the noble gases.
 The 18-electron rule is a rule of thumb in transition metal chemistry for characterising and predicting the stability of metal complexes.

In religion and literature
Consequently, the custom has arisen in Jewish circles to give donations and monetary gifts in multiples of 18 as an expression of blessing for long life.
 In Judaism, in the Talmud; Pirkei Avot (5:25), Rabbi Yehudah ben Teime gives the age of 18 as the appropriate age to get married ("Ben shmonah esra lechupah", at eighteen years old to the Chupah (marriage canopy)). (See Coming of age, Age of majority).
 Shemoneh Esrei (sh'MOH-nuh ES-ray) is a prayer that is the center of any Jewish religious service. Its name means "eighteen". The prayer is also known as the Amidah.
 In Ancient Roman custom the number 18 can symbolise a blood relative.
 Joseph Heller's novel Catch-22 was originally named Catch-18 because of the Hebrew meaning of the number, but was amended to the published title to avoid confusion with another war novel, Mila 18.
 There are 18 chapters in the Bhagavad Gita, which is contained in the Mahabharata, which has 18 books. The Kurukshetra War which the epic depicts, is between 18 armies (11 on the Kuru side, 7 on the Pandava). The war itself lasts for 18 days. In the other Hindu epic, the Ramayana, the war between Rama and the demons also lasted 18 days.
 In Babism the first 18 disciples of the Báb were known as the Letters of the Living.

As lucky or unlucky number
 In Chinese tradition, 18 is pronounced  and is considered a lucky number due to similarity with  'definitely get rich', 'to get rich for sure'.
According to applications of numerology in Judaism, the letters of the word chai ("living") add up to 18. Thus, 18 is considered a lucky number and many gifts for B'nai Mitzvot and weddings are in $18 increments.

Age 18

In most countries, 18 is the age of majority, in which a minor becomes a legal adult. It is also the voting age, marriageable age, drinking age and smoking age in most countries, though sometimes these ages are different than the age of majority.  Many websites restrict adult content to visitors who claim to be aged over 18.

In the United States, 18 is the:
Age for sexual consent in eleven states and under federal law.
Minimum age to purchase firearms in thirty-eight states with the exception of handguns (21 under federal law).
Marriageable age without parental consent except for Nebraska (19), Mississippi and Puerto Rico (21).
The minimum age at which one can purchase, rent, or buy tickets to NC-17-rated films or buy video games with an Adults Only rating.
In the UK, it is the legal age to purchase a BBFC "18" rated film.

In sports 
 In association football (soccer), "the 18" is a slang term for the penalty area.
 In Australian rules football (except in AFL Women's), each team has 18 players on the field during play.
 There are 18 holes on a regulation golf course.
 In Nippon Professional Baseball (Japanese baseball), No.18 is known as Ace number.

See also
 Numeral system

Notes

Integers